Michael Hans Kaiser (born 20 April 1963 in Brisbane) is a former Australian politician with degrees in Electrical Engineering and Economics from the University of Queensland. He was a Labor Party member of the Legislative Assembly of Queensland from 2000 to 2001, representing the electorate of Woodridge. A former state secretary of the Queensland division of the Labor Party, he resigned as an MP after an inquiry found that he was used in a 1986 Labor Party branch stacking exercise. Editorializing on his resignation, The Brisbane Courier Mail wrote: "It was a penalty this newspaper has stated was disproportionate to the offence he committed." 19 August 2003.

After conducting his own Government Affairs consultancy, he was rehabilitated by the Australian Labor Party in 2003 and served as its Assistant National Secretary in the lead up to and during the 2004 federal election.

He was subsequently employed as the Chief of Staff to New South Wales Premier Morris Iemma before becoming Chief of Staff to Queensland Premier Anna Bligh in late 2007.

In December 2009, Kaiser commenced employment with NBN Co, the Company established by the Rudd Government to design, build and operate a National Broadband Network, as its Corporate Affairs Executive. In September 2011 he became NBN Co's Head of Quality, responsible for customer/ consumer satisfaction, process improvement, data quality and response management.

In January 2022 Kaiser commenced as the Director-General of the Queensland Department of Resources.

As of May 2022, Kaiser is the Director-General of the Queensland Department of State Development, Infrastructure, Local Government and Planning.

References 

1963 births
Living people
Members of the Queensland Legislative Assembly
Australian Labor Party members of the Parliament of Queensland
21st-century Australian politicians